In mathematics, resolvent meaning "that which resolves" may refer to:
 Resolvent formalism in operator theory
 Resolvent set in operator theory, the set of points where an operator is "well-behaved"
 Feller process#Resolvent in probability theory
 Resolvent (Galois theory) of an equation for a permutation group, in particular:
 Resolvent quadratic of a cubic equation
 Resolvent cubic of a quartic equation

In logic:
 Resolvent (logic), the clause produced by a resolution
 In the consensus theorem, the term produced by a consensus in Boolean logic